Jeff Robertshaw (born March 27, 1983) is a former Canadian football defensive end. He was signed as an undrafted free agent by the Hamilton Tiger-Cats in 2007. He played college football at McMaster. Nowadays he is one of the best awarded and favored teachers at Columbia International College in Hamilton, Ontario. Although he is now a free agent, he still relates to football by coaching and playing with his friends.

External links
Just Sports Stats
Montreal Alouettes bio

Sportspeople from Hamilton, Ontario
Hamilton Tiger-Cats players
Montreal Alouettes players
Canadian football defensive linemen
Players of Canadian football from Ontario
McMaster Marauders football players
1983 births
Living people